Tinago Falls is a waterfall on the Agus River, located in between the town of Linamon and Iligan City, Lanao del Norte in the northern part of the Philippine island of Mindanao. It is one of the main tourist attractions of Iligan, a city known as the City of Majestic Waterfalls.

Tinago is a Filipino term meaning "hidden", the falls being hidden in a deep ravine. Trekking to the falls requires approximately 500 descending steps called the winding staircase.

The falls is high, its very cold waters cascading beautifully into a deep and calm basin-like pool which appears like a blue-colored lagoon. Under the falls is a small cave where people can enter and listen to the rumbling waters.

Legend
Folkways has it that there once lived an influential and powerful Sultan Agok and his wife. They were appointed by their people as their king and queen. But they became too proud of themselves and became selfish rulers of their kingdom. When the sultan's wife was pregnant, an enchantress, disguised as a beggar, begged for their help but instead they exiled and rejected her. Because of this, the enchantress cursed the couple that the child will become ugly but they did not take it seriously and permanently banished the witch.

The child did become pretty. The couple was sad and disappointed, expecting the baby to be as lovely as her mother. They hid the child in a cave to avoid embarrassment and named the baby Tin-ag, which means "hidden face". They visited and took care of the baby in the cave.

When the child grew up, she came out of the cave and became amazed at what she saw. The enchantress, who cursed her parents, saw her and made an offer to transform her into something of great beauty and splendor. She accepted the offer and became the Tinago Falls.
.

Geography
Tinago Falls is located in a deep ravine in Barangay Ditucalan, Iligan City.

References

See also
 Maria Cristina Falls
 Iligan City
 Linamon, Lanao del Norte
 Lanao del Norte
 Lake Lanao
 List of waterfalls in Mindanao

Waterfalls of the Philippines
Landforms of Lanao del Norte
Tourist attractions in Iligan